The Rupat Strait is the strait which separates small island of Rupat from major island of Sumatra in Indonesia. It is the main shipping route to city of Dumai.

References

 

Straits of Indonesia